The Gil Evans Orchestra Plays the Music of Jimi Hendrix is an album of Jimi Hendrix's compositions by jazz composer, conductor and pianist Gil Evans. The music was arranged by Evans and members of his orchestra. The album was recorded in 1974 and performed by Evans with an orchestra featuring David Sanborn, Howard Johnson, Billy Harper, and John Abercrombie. The album was re-released with additional tracks on CD in 1988.

Reception
The Allmusic review by Scott Yanow awarded the album 4½ stars stating "Evans' arrangements uplift many of Hendrix's more blues-oriented compositions and create a memorable set that is rock-oriented but retains the improvisation and personality of jazz".

Track listing
All compositions by Jimi Hendrix
 "Angel" – 4:09 (arr. by Tom Malone) 
 "Crosstown Traffic / Little Miss Lover" – 6:32 (arr. by Tom Malone)  
 "Castles Made of Sand (arr. by Gil Evans) / Foxey Lady" (arr. by Warren Smith) – 11:26  
 "Up from the Skies" [Take 1 – Original Master] – 9:16 (arr. by Gil Evans)
 "1983... (A Merman I Should Turn to Be)" – 7:32 (arr. by David Horowitz)
 "Voodoo Child" – 5:02 (arr. by Howard Johnson)
 "Gypsy Eyes" – 3:40 (arr. by Trevor Koehler) 
 "Little Wing" – 5:33 Bonus track on CD reissue (arr. by Gil Evans)
 "Up from the Skies" [Take 2 – Alternate Take] – 9:53 (arr. by Gil Evans) Bonus track on CD reissue   
Recorded in RCA's Studio B in New York City on 11 June (tracks 4 & 9), 12 June (tracks 2, 6 & 7) and 13 June (tracks 1, 3 & 5), 1974, and 14, 25 & 28 April 1975 (track 8)

Personnel
Gil Evans – piano, electric piano, arranger, conductor
Hannibal Marvin Peterson – trumpet, vocals  
Lew Soloff – trumpet, flugelhorn, piccolo trumpet  
Peter Gordon – French horn  
Pete Levin – French horn, synthesizer  
Tom Malone – trombone, bass trombone, flute, synthesizer, arranger  
Howard Johnson – tuba, bass clarinet, electric bass, arranger
David Sanborn – alto saxophone, soprano saxophone, flute  
Billy Harper – tenor saxophone, flute  
Trevor Koehler – tenor saxophone, alto saxophone, flute, baritone saxophone, soprano saxophone, arranger 
John Abercrombie, Ryo Kawasaki – electric guitar  
Keith Loving – guitar  
Don Pate – bass  
Michael Moore – electric bass, acoustic bass  
Bruce Ditmas – drums  
Warren Smith – vibraphone, marimba, chimes, latin percussion  
Sue Evans – drums, congas, percussion

References 

1974 albums
Gil Evans albums
Albums arranged by Gil Evans
RCA Records albums
Jimi Hendrix tribute albums